Juanita Creek is a creek in King County, Washington that flows through the city of Kirkland. The creek runs about  before entering Lake Washington's Juanita Bay at Juanita Beach Park.

See also
 List of rivers of Washington

References 

. USGS. Retrieved on 2007-12-24.

Rivers of King County, Washington
Rivers of Washington (state)